is a Japanese manga series written and illustrated by Tsubasa Fukuchi. It was serialized in Shogakukan's Weekly Shōnen Sunday from April 2019 to July 2021.

Publication
Ponkotsu-chan Kenshōchū, written and illustrated by Tsubasa Fukuchi, was serialized in Shogakukan's Weekly Shōnen Sunday from April 24, 2019 to July 21, 2021. Shogakukan collected its chapters into ten tankōbon volumes, released from September 18, 2019 to August 18, 2021.

Volume list

Reception
In 2020, the manga was one of the 50 nominees for the 6th Next Manga Awards.

References

External links
 

Romantic comedy anime and manga
Shogakukan manga
Shōnen manga